George Van Williams (born March 15, 1959) is a former American football running back in the National Football League (NFL) for the Buffalo Bills and the New York Giants.  He played college football at East Tennessee State University and Carson-Newman College and was drafted in the fourth round of the 1982 NFL Draft. Graduated from Science Hill High School in Johnson City, TN.

External links
NFL.com player page

1959 births
American football running backs
Buffalo Bills players
Carson–Newman Eagles football players
East Tennessee State Buccaneers football players
Living people
New York Giants players
People from Johnson City, Tennessee
National Football League replacement players